Sergei Anatolyevich  Antipov (born May 15, 1974) is a Kazakhstani retired professional ice hockey player.

Career
Antipov began his career with Torpedo Ust-Kamenogorsk in the Soviet Hockey Championship in 1991. He played with Torpedo until joining Sibir Novosibirsk for one season in the Vysshaya Liga. In the 1998–99 season, Antipov split time in the Polska Liga Hokejowa between KH Sanok and Podhale Nowy Targ, before joining Unia Oswiecim for the 1999–00 season. Antipov then returned to Kazzinc-Torpedo for three seasons, from 2000–2003, before finishing his career with Yenbek Almaty in 2004.

During his career, Antipov participated with the Kazakhstan men's national ice hockey team at the IIHF World Championships four times, in 1995, 2000, 2001, and 2002.

External links

1974 births
Kazakhstani ice hockey right wingers
Living people
Sportspeople from Tashkent
Kazzinc-Torpedo players
Yenbek Almaty players
HC Sibir Novosibirsk players
Podhale Nowy Targ players
Soviet ice hockey right wingers
TH Unia Oświęcim players
Asian Games gold medalists for Kazakhstan
Asian Games silver medalists for Kazakhstan
Medalists at the 1996 Asian Winter Games
Medalists at the 2003 Asian Winter Games
Asian Games medalists in ice hockey
Ice hockey players at the 1996 Asian Winter Games
Ice hockey players at the 2003 Asian Winter Games